Woollahra is a suburb in the Eastern Suburbs of Sydney, in the state of New South Wales, Australia. Woollahra is located 5 kilometres east of the Sydney central business district, in the local government area of the Municipality of Woollahra. Woollahra is located on the traditional land of the Birrabirragal and Gadigal people of the Eora Nation. The Municipality of Woollahra takes its name from the suburb but its administrative centre is located in Double Bay. Woollahra is famous for its quiet, tree-lined residential streets and village-style shopping centre.

History
Woollahra is an Aboriginal word meaning camp, meeting ground or a sitting down place. It was adopted by Daniel Cooper (1821–1902), the first speaker of the legislative assembly of New South Wales, when he laid the foundations of Woollahra House in 1856. It was built on the site of the old Henrietta Villa (or Point Piper House). Cooper and his descendants were responsible for the establishment and progress of the suburb and its name was taken from the house.

Although Woollahra is predominantly a residential and retail area today, for over forty years and into early 20th century, there was a large iron foundry and cooking stove factory on Edgecliff Road.

Woollahra was the home of John McGarvie Smith, a metallurgist and biochemist who produced the first preservable anthrax vaccine.

Heritage listings 
Woollahra has a number of heritage-listed sites, including:
 14 Rosemont Avenue: Rosemont (Woollahra)
 Waimea Avenue: Waimea House

Population
At the 2021 census, the population of Woollahra was 7,189, down from 7,405 people in 2016. 63.1% of people were born in Australia. The next most common countries of birth were England 6.7%, New Zealand 2.9%, South Africa 2.8% and the United States of America 1.7%. 79.6% of people spoke only English at home. Other languages spoken at home included Mandarin at 2.7%, Spanish 1.4% and French 1.3%. The most common responses for religion in Woollahra were No Religion 41.3%, Catholic 19.1% and Anglican 14.5%.

Commercial area
Woollahra, along with its neighbouring suburb, Paddington, has the highest concentration of art galleries in Sydney. There are numerous cafes, restaurants and antique shops clustered around Queen Street.

The suburb is home to many government consulates, including Serbia, Russia, Poland, and Turkey.

Churches

One of the more prominent churches, All Saints in Ocean Street, was designed by Edmund Blacket and built from 1874 to 1881. Henry Mort, a resident of Ocean Street, donated £3,000 towards the construction of the church. However, the church was never entirely finished; it includes a porch that was meant to be a base for a tower and spire, which was designed but never built. It is constructed predominantly of dressed sandstone and is now listed on the Register of the National Estate. It has been described as "a beautifully designed and crafted parish church that has important connections with many famous Australian families."

A stylistic contrast is provided by the Holy Cross Church in Adelaide Street. This brick church was designed by Austin Mackay and built in 1940. It is a rarity insofar as it is an Art Deco church, which is unusual enough, and it also shows the influence of Dutch architecture.

The Congregational Church, on the corner of Jersey Road and Moncur Street, was built in 1875-77 and designed by Benjamin Backhouse. It was burned out much later but eventually restored and converted to residential use. It is listed on the Register of the National Estate.

Housing

Woollahra is a considerably affluent suburb, due in part to its proximity to the city and the shopping centre at Bondi Junction, plus a wide range of picturesque homes, mostly in various Victorian styles. Moncur Street and Queen Street are particularly affluent areas, with a mixture of residential and commercial buildings and an extraordinarily high number of heritage-listed buildings. High-rise development has been avoided, maintaining the heritage character of the suburb. Despite this, more sympathetic styles of apartment complexes and high-rise commercial developments have been proposed. Most of the suburb's housing stock exists in the form of medium or high-density dwelling, as opposed to more high-rise centred regions like Zetland. In 2014, the Woollahra Council recorded 26,050 dwellings in the area, with "approximately 76% of all dwellings being multi-unit housing (generally residential flat buildings)". The remaining 24% of all dwellings are listed in the category of detached houses, semi-detached houses and terrace houses.

Schools

Woollahra Public School opened in 1877. It is a two-storey brick building that was designed by J. Wigram and W. Kemp. The building is listed on the Register of the National Estate. The school includes Opportunity Classes in Years 5 and 6 for gifted students. The school celebrated its centenary in 1977 and a time capsule was buried in the grounds.

Transport

Woollahra is serviced by Transdev John Holland and Transit Systems bus services, including the 200 and 389 routes, as well as numerous services along Oxford Street in the suburb's south. Routes 333 and 440 provide direct services to the Sydney CBD from Oxford Street. The 352 on Oxford Street provides commuters with a service to Surry Hills, Newtown and eventually Marrickville Metro in the city's south.

The nearest railway stations are Edgecliff to the north of the suburb and Bondi Junction to the south, both on the Illawarra line.  When the Eastern Suburbs railway was constructed in the 1970s, there were plans to include a railway station in Woollahra itself, but this was opposed by local residents and the station was never built.

Culture and events

Queen Street Fair
From 1972, a fair was held in Queen Street. Initially a community fair, it grew and became more commercial until local residents became unhappy with its noise, size, and disruption. Consequently, the fair ceased after 1985.

Sport and recreation

Since 1908, Woollahra has been represented in one of Australia's most popular sporting competitions, the National Rugby League, by the Sydney Roosters, officially known as the Eastern Suburbs District Rugby League Football Club.

Gallery

References

External links 

 2001 Census Information

 
Suburbs of Sydney